Lonely Night may refer to:

 "Lonely Night (Angel Face)", a 1976 song by Captain & Tennille
 "Lonely Night", a single from Vigilante by the British group Magnum
 "Lonely Night", a 2016 song by Korean rapper Gary featuring Gaeko
 "The Lonely Night", a 2013 song by Moby and Mark Lanegan, featured on Moby's Innocents

See also 
 Lonely Nights (disambiguation)